The 2022–23 Kenyan Premier League will be the 20th season of the Kenyan Premier League since it began in 2003, and the 60th season of top-division football in Kenya since 1963. The season was set to commence on 24 September, however, an ongoing technical dispute with FIFA pushed the start to 19 November 2022.

Team Changes 
APS Bomet and Fortune SACCO gained promotion to the Premier League from the 2021–22 National Super League, with Mathare United and Vihiga United being relegated. However, the FKF announced on 9 November 202 that the results of the 2021–22 Premier League were abandoned due to an ongoing technical dispute with FIFA, and the promotion/regelation from the previous season was canceled.

Stadiums

Personnel and sponsoring

League table

Results

Season statistics

Top scorers

Hat-tricks

References 

Kenyan Premier League seasons
2022 in Kenyan football
2023 in Kenyan football
K